Sodium salicylate is a sodium salt of salicylic acid. It can be prepared from sodium phenolate and carbon dioxide under higher temperature and pressure. Historically, it has been synthesized by refluxing  methyl salicylate (wintergreen oil) with an excess of sodium hydroxide.

Properties
Sodium salicylate is of the salicylate family.

Uses
It is used in medicine as an analgesic and antipyretic. Sodium salicylate also acts as non-steroidal anti-inflammatory drug (NSAID), and induces apoptosis in cancer cells  and also necrosis. It is also a potential replacement for aspirin for people sensitive to it. It may also be used as a phosphor for the detection of vacuum ultraviolet radiation and electrons.

References

External links 

 Chemicalland21
 vhc
 Some synonyms
 Safety data for sodium salicylate at Oxford University
 Sodium salicylate, definitions at National Cancer Institute

Organic sodium salts
Salicylates
3-Hydroxypropenals